Frank J. Haggerty (c. 1876 – September 19, 1962) was an American football, basketball, and baseball coach.  He served as the head football coach at the University of Akron—known as Buchtel College until 1913—for five seasons from 1910 to 1914, compiling a record of 22–16–3.  Haggerty also coached the men's basketball team at Akron those five academic years, 1910–1915, tallying a mark of 30–23.  He was also the head baseball coach at St. Vincent's College, now Loyola Marymount University, from 1906 to 1907, at Buchtel/Akron from 1910 to 1913 and again in 1915, and at DePaul University in 1923, amassing a career college baseball record of 33–23.  Haggerty was a graduate of Colby College.  He died from cancer at the age of 86 on September 19, 1962 at his home in Chicago, Illinois.

Head coaching record

Football

Basketball

References

Year of birth uncertain
1870s births
1962 deaths
Akron Zips baseball coaches
Akron Zips football coaches
Akron Zips men's basketball coaches
DePaul Blue Demons athletic directors
DePaul Blue Demons baseball coaches
DePaul Blue Demons football coaches
Great Lakes Navy Bluejackets football coaches
Loyola Marymount Lions baseball coaches
Loyola Lions football coaches
Colby College alumni
Deaths from cancer in Illinois